The Henderson Gamecocks were a minor league baseball team based in Henderson, North Carolina. From 1929 to 1931, Henderson teams played exclusively as members of the Class C level Piedmont League, winning the 1930 pennant. The 1929 Henderson Bunnies and the Gamecocks hosted minor league home games as Lassiter Park.

History
Henderson, North Carolina first hosted league baseball play in 1929. The Henderson Bunnies became members of the six–team Class C level Piedmont League. The Durham Bulls, Greensboro Patriots, High Point Pointers, Salisbury-Spencer Colonials,and Winston-Salem Twins  joined Henderson as 1929 league members. The Henderson franchise replaced the Raleigh Capitals in league play.

Beginning Piedmont League play on April 24, 1929, the Henderson Bunnies placed 5th in the six–team Piedmont League regular season standings. The Bunnies ended the regular season with a record of 54–85, playing under manager and "Bunnies" namesake Bunny Hearn. On May 24, 1929, Hearn was replaced as manager by Lewis Murphy. Other managers were Guy Winston and Lee Gooch. Henderson finished 32.5 games behind the 1st place Durham Bulls in the final Piedmont League regular season standings. The Bunnies did not qualify for the two–team playoffs won by the Greensboro Patriots.

Continuing in their second season of play, the renamed Henderson "Gamecocks" won the 1930 Piedmont League pennant. The Henderson Gamecocks placed 1st in the six–team Piedmont League regular season standings, ending the regular season with a record of 78–63, playing under manager Jimmy Teague. Henderson finished 9.0 games ahead the 2nd place Durham Bulls in the Piedmont League regular season standings and qualified for the two–team playoff. The Durham Bulls defeated the Henderson 4 games to 3 in the Finals.

In their final season of play, the 1931 Henderson Gamecocks played in the final season of eight–team Piedmont League, which expanded, adding the Asheville Tourists and Charlotte Hornets franchises. The Gamecocks ended their final season in 7th place. With a record of 51–82, playing under managers Jimmy Teague and Mack Arnette, the Gamecocks finished 42.5 games behind the 1st place Charlotte Hornets in the final regular season standings. Henderson did not qualify for the two–team playoff, won by the Charlotte Hornets. The Piedmont League permanently folded following the 1931 season.

Henderson, North Carolina has not hosted another minor league team.

The ballpark
The Henderson Bunnies and Gamecocks teams hosted home minor league home games at Lassiter Park. It was reported the ballpark had a capacity of 3,000.

Timeline

Year–by–year records

Notable alumni

Larry Boerner (1929)
Cap Clark (1931)
Lee Gooch (1929, MGR)
Bunny Hearn (1929, MGR)
Carl Husta (1929)
John Jones (1929–1930)
Ike Kahdot (1930–1931)
Joe Poetz (1930)
Eddie Wilson (1930)
Mutt Wilson (1930)
Hank Winston (1930)

See also
Henderson Bunnies playersHenderson Gamecocks players

References

External links
Baseball Reference

Defunct minor league baseball teams
Defunct baseball teams in North Carolina
Baseball teams established in 1930
Baseball teams disestablished in 1931
Vance County, North Carolina
Piedmont League teams